Johnsonville is a large suburb in northern Wellington, New Zealand. It is seven kilometres north of the city centre, at the top of the Ngauranga Gorge, on the main route to Porirua (State Highway 1). It is commonly known by locals as "J'ville".

History

Johnson's clearing
Johnsonville was originally the site of a Māori track from Wellington to Porirua (the Old Porirua Road), and had no native inhabitants before European settlement. Vegetation was dense native forest, dominated by totara, mixed podocarp trees (notably totara and Rimu), Rata and hinau. Johnsonville was settled in 1841 by, among others, Frank Johnson who had purchased a certificate of selection and had drawn the 100 acre 'Section 11 Kinapora (Kenepuru) District'. Initially called 'Johnson's clearing', Frank Johnson built a house by the Johnsonville stream and a timber mill near the center of modern Johnsonville. He quickly denuded the entire Johnsonville area of virgin native forest, with timber sold to help build the nearby town of Wellington. He soon sold his land at a substantial profit, and returned to England by 1858 leaving the environment massively changed, and on which site a farming industry to support nearby Wellington City grew. The Daisy Hill Farm House was built about 1860, and is still standing.

Over the 20th century, farmland slowly gave way to Suburbia, with the first tiny township of Johnsonville steadily growing to become populated principally by a "mid-level" socio-economic strata. Johnsonville was a town by 1896.

1886: the railway arrives
The opening of the railway to Wellington by the Wellington and Manawatu Railway Company in 1886 (see Johnsonville Branch and Johnsonville Station) enabled people to commute to Wellington, and the line was electrified with more frequent and faster trains in 1938.

About 1894 stockyards were built in Broderick Road adjacent to the station sidings by Freeman R. Jackson. Stock (cattle and sheep) railed from the Manawatu and elsewhere were driven through the streets and down Fraser Avenue to the Ngauranga abattoir. The suburb got the name "Cowtown", and residents complained about hygiene and noise. So a new siding and stockyard was opened near Raroa station in 1958.

Town Board 
Johnsonville was proclaimed a local board in 1874. From 1881 it was a dependent town district, renamed in 1887 the Johnsonville Town District. In 1908 the Town Board became independent. In 1909 John Rod, Chairman of the Town Board, negotiated for electric power; supplied by the Hutt Valley Electric Power Board and installed in Johnsonville by Norman Heath & Co. The board was active in the 1912-1922 period when gas lighting and drainage were installed and streets kerbed and channeled. In 1912 a water reservoir was built for water supplied from Ohariu Valley, and a new reservoir built in 1922. Drainage installed in 1912 was to a septic tank in Ngauranga Gorge. The septic tank lasted to 1953; when Johnsonville amalgamated with the Wellington City Council in April and the council completed a main sewer to the area. Surrounding areas also joined Wellington; like Raroa, which had been in the Hutt County Council.

The Town Board area was extended to the Hawtrey Estate north of Ironside Road from 1 April 1932, and the board installed some standpipes to fill water buckets.

The population grew from 143 in 1874 to 206 in 1878 and 438 (in 83 dwellings) in 1897. The population almost doubled between 1901 (502) and 1911, and was just over 3000 by 1951. In 1976 it was 9230; a 37% increase 1956-66 and 106% increase 1966–76.

Wellington suburb 

The town grew rapidly from 1938 with state houses built on the former Native Reserve between Broderick Road and Fraser Avenue; the first was built in Bould Street. From 1938 to 1956, 329 state houses were built.

In the 1960s, the first shopping mall in the Wellington region was built in Johnsonville.

Demographics

Johnsonville had a population of 11,106 at the 2018 New Zealand census, an increase of 870 people (8.5%) since the 2013 census, and an increase of 1,866 people (20.2%) since the 2006 census. There were 3,942 households. There were 5,394 males and 5,712 females, giving a sex ratio of 0.94 males per female, with 2,211 people (19.9%) aged under 15 years, 2,202 (19.8%) aged 15 to 29, 5,349 (48.2%) aged 30 to 64, and 1,350 (12.2%) aged 65 or older.

Ethnicities were 61.2% European/Pākehā, 9.8% Māori, 5.9% Pacific peoples, 30.3% Asian, and 3.8% other ethnicities (totals add to more than 100% since people could identify with multiple ethnicities).

The proportion of people born overseas was 36.7%, compared with 27.1% nationally.

Although some people objected to giving their religion, 43.9% had no religion, 37.3% were Christian, 5.2% were Hindu, 2.1% were Muslim, 2.1% were Buddhist and 3.3% had other religions.

Of those at least 15 years old, 3,381 (38.0%) people had a bachelor or higher degree, and 885 (9.9%) people had no formal qualifications. The employment status of those at least 15 was that 4,890 (55.0%) people were employed full-time, 1,176 (13.2%) were part-time, and 387 (4.4%) were unemployed.

Infrastructure 

Johnsonville has a modestly large commercial infrastructure and is self-sufficient in many ways; it has a shopping mall, two supermarkets, library and a community hub.

Public transport 

Johnsonville is a reasonably large residential and commercial suburb. Johnsonville Station is the northern terminus of the Johnsonville branch line of the Tranz Metro electric passenger service to central Wellington, with an adjacent bus stop for several routes known as the Johnsonville Hub. Johnsonville supports a large commuter population. Housing is spread around the shopping hub in the centre and extends out to the base of Mt Kaukau to the west, and out across the hill towards the suburb of Newlands to the south-east.

Keith Spry Pool
Keith Spry pool is an indoor 25 meter heated pool with a diving pool, toddler pool, spa, and sauna: opened in June 1982. The pool is run by Wellington City Council. In June 2013, work started on a $6 million revamp of the facilities which expanded the complex by 50 percent, adding a new learn to swim pool, replacing the roof and expanding the changing rooms. In 2019, Keith Spry Pool and Johnsonville Library was brought under the wings of Waitohi Hub.

Alex Moore Park
Alex Moore park is a sporting ground located on Broderick Road / Moorefield Road. The grounds host football, rugby, cricket, softball and athletics. The facilities include an artificial cricket surface, changing rooms and club house. The Alex Moore Park Development Project is planning a $6 million sports centre on the site that will replace disparate and outdated sports clubrooms with a centralised gym, meeting rooms and function area.

Johnsonville Community Centre
The Johnsonville Community Centre is located on the corner of Frankmoore Avenue and Moorefield Road and provides community services including education, Citizens Advice Bureau, support groups and youth groups. The building is owned by the Wellington City Council and was opened in 1995 after significant investment and fund raising by local community groups.

Regional planning 
As a part of the Northern Growth Management Plan from Wellington City Council, there exists a proposal to redevelop Johnsonville's main precinct into the "Johnsonville Town Centre". This plan recognises Johnsonville as Wellington's most economically important commercial and population hub outside the city centre. The plan recommends the creation of a unique and identifiable Johnsonville culture around the triangular precinct - bounded by Johnsonville Road to the east, Broderick Road to the south and Moorefield Road to the west.

Community and social groups
Johnsonville has a number of community groups including:
 The Johnsonville Club
 Johnsonville Community Centre (next to Keith Spry pool)
 Johnsonville Lions & Rotary
 Johnsonville Community Association (Inc.)

Economy

Retail

Johnsonville Shopping Centre consists of 500 carparks and 70 shops, including a Countdown supermarket.

Education

School enrollment zones
Johnsonville is within the enrollment zones for Onslow College, Newlands College, St Oran's College, Raroa Normal Intermediate and Johnsonville School.

Secondary education
Johnsonville is home to the co-educational high school Onslow College.

Primary and intermediate education
Johnsonville has one intermediate school and several primary schools:

Nearby suburbs
The residents of nearby suburbs such as Churton Park, Grenada Village, Newlands, Khandallah, Ngaio, Raroa and Broadmeadows also use Johnsonville's facilities - especially for shopping at the Johnsonville Shopping Centre. While many of these centres have new supermarkets, the range of shops available in Johnsonville is a major attraction to the wider district.

See also 
 John Rod, Johnsonville resident

Further reading

References

External links

 North Wellington Community Web Site
 Johnsonville in the Cyclopaedia of New Zealand, 1897
 
 
  

Suburbs of Wellington City